Schroederella is a genus of flies in the family Heleomyzidae. There are about 14 described species in Schroederella.

Species
These 14 species belong to the genus Schroederella:

 Schroederella bifida Papp & Carles-Tolra, 1994 c g
 Schroederella fuscopicea Gill, 1962 i c g
 Schroederella hispanica Papp & Carles-Tolra, 1994 c g
 Schroederella hungarica Papp & Carles-Tolra, 1994 c g
 Schroederella iners (Meigen, 1830) i c g b
 Schroederella kirilli Papp, 2007 c g
 Schroederella luteoala (Garrett, 1925) i c g
 Schroederella media Papp, 2007 c g
 Schroederella minuta Papp & Carles-Tolra, 1994 c g
 Schroederella nigra (Czerny, 1931) c g
 Schroederella nipponica Okadome, 1969 c g
 Schroederella pectinulata (Czerny, 1931) c g
 Schroederella robusta Gorodkov, 1962 c g
 Schroederella segnis Czerny, 1930 c g

Data sources: i = ITIS, c = Catalogue of Life, g = GBIF, b = Bugguide.net

References

Further reading

External links

 
 

Heleomyzidae
Sphaeroceroidea genera
Taxa named by Günther Enderlein